Prosecutor Princess is a 2010 South Korean television series starring Kim So-yeon, Park Si-hoo, Han Jung-soo and Choi Song-hyun. It aired on SBS from March 31 to May 20, 2010 on Wednesdays and Thursdays at 21:55 for 16 episodes.

Plot
After Ma Hye-ri (Kim So-yeon) passes the bar exam, she discovers that her love of fashion and dislike of overtime interferes with her ability to carry out her duties as a public prosecutor. She faces opposition from contemptuous colleagues and exasperated superiors. With her career on a downward spiral, she enlists the help of mysterious attorney Seo In-woo (Park Si-hoo) .

Cast

Main
Kim So-yeon as Ma Hye-ri
freshly appointed prosecutor, daughter of construction company president
Park Si-hoo as Seo In-woo (Shin Dong-ki as young Seo In-woo)
lawyer, educated and raised in USA, returned to Korea with hidden agenda
Han Jung-soo as Yoon Se-joon
prosecutor, widower with daughter
Choi Song-hyun as Jin Jeong-seon
prosecutor, single, living with her mother who is raising Yoon Se-joon's daughter

Supporting

Prosecutor Office
Kim Sang-ho as Na Joong-seok, Chief Prosecutor
Yoo Gun as Lee Min-seok, prosecutor
Choi Sung-ho as Chae Ji-woon, prosecutor
Lee Jong-suk as Lee Woo-hyun, Yoon Se-joon's investigator
Lee Seung-hyung as Cha Myung-soo, Ma Hye-ri's investigator
Lee Eun-hee as Lee Jung-im, Ma Hye-ri's paralegal

People around Ma Hye-ri
Choi Jung-woo as Ma Sang-tae, Ma Hye-ri's father
Yang Hee-kyung as Park Ae-ja, Ma Hye-ri's mother
Min Young-won as Lee Yoo-na, Ma Hye-ri's best friend

Others
Park Jung-ah as Jenny Ahn, lawyer, Seo In-woo's friend
Sung Byung-sook as Han Mi-ok, Jin Jeong-seon's mother
Kim Ji-won as Yoon Bin, Yoon Se-joon's daughter
Lee Il-hwa as Ha Jung-ran, bar owner
Sunwoo Jae-duk as Go Man-chul, Ma Sang-tae's junior from his home town
Jeong Gyu-Soo as Shin Jung-nam, flower shop owner
Moon Joon-young as Minor in club

Special Appearance
Baek Seung-hyeon as Kim Dong-seok, criminal chased by Yoon Se-joon (ep. 1 & 7)
Choi Eun-joo as Lee Moon-hae, Kim Dong-seok's accomplice (ep. 1 & 7)
Kim Dong-gyun as man who trespassed Hye-ri's apartment (ep. 9 & 11)
Lee Soo-jin as Hye-ri's law school friend
Kim Sung-hoon as Fitness trainer
Jeon Jin-gi as Detective
Ahn Sang-tae as Hotel employee

Ratings

International broadcast
It aired in Japan on cable channel KNTV beginning October 18, 2010, then on terrestrial network Fuji TV in 2011.

Original soundtrack

Fly High

"Fly High" was the first digital single and soundtrack to be released from Prosecutor Princess OST, performed by South Korean R&B boy group Shinee. "Fly High" ranked at spot 46 and peaked at spot 38 of Gaon Chart upon release.

Background and release
"Fly High" was composed by Oh Jun-seong of Forrest Media who was the producer of the Prosecutor Princess OST, and the vocals were provided by Shinee of SM Entertainment. The song was released as one of the two tracks of digital single Prosecutor Princess OST Part 1 on April 2, 2010.

Promotion
A promotional music video of "Fly High" featuring scenes from the TV drama series was released in late May 2010. The song was performed by Shinee during their first Asia tour Shinee World and the live version was included in live album Shinee World. The Japanese version was performed during Shinee's first Japanese arena tour Shinee World 2012.

References

External links
 Prosecutor Princess official SBS website 
 
 

Seoul Broadcasting System television dramas
Korean-language television shows
2010 South Korean television series debuts
2010 South Korean television series endings
Television series about prosecutors
South Korean romantic comedy television series
South Korean legal television series